is the main railway station in the city of Kōfu, Yamanashi Prefecture, Japan. It is managed by the East Japan Railway Company (JR East).

Lines
It is also the northern terminus of the 83.1 kilometer JR Central Minobu Line.

Layout
The station has one side platform and two island platforms which are shared by both JR East and JR Central. The ticket offices and gates are located on a bridge over the tracks. The station has a Midori no Madoguchi staffed ticket office.

Platforms

History
Kōfu Station was opened on 11 June 1903 with the extension of government railway (later named Chūō Main Line) from Hajikano Station (now Kai-Yamato Station). The line was later extended from Kōfu Station to Nirasaki Station on 15 December 1903. The privately-owned Fuji-Minobu Railway connected Ichikawa-Daimon Station to Kōfu on 30 March 1928. This line was nationalized on 1 May 1941, becoming the Minobu Line. All freight operations were discontinued from 1 February 1984. Along with the division and privatization of JNR on 1 April 1987, the station came under the joint control of the East Japan Railway Company.

Passenger statistics
In fiscal 2017, the station was used by an average of 15,090 passengers daily (boarding passengers only).

Surrounding area 
Kōfu Station is located in the heart of Kofu City.
nearby places:
 Yamanashi Science Museum
 Takeda Shrine
Yamanashi Prefectural Assembly
 Kōfu City Hall

References

External links

 Kōfu Station (JR East) 

Railway stations in Yamanashi Prefecture
Railway stations in Japan opened in 1903
Chūō Main Line
Stations of East Japan Railway Company
Minobu Line
Kōfu, Yamanashi